Maddirala mandal is one of the 23 mandals in Suryapet district of the Indian state of Telangana. It is under the administration of Suryapet revenue division with its headquarters at Maddirala. It is carved out from Thungaturthy and Nuthankal mandals. It is bounded by Thungaturthy mandal towards West, Nuthankal mandal towards South, Mahabubabad district towards North.

Geography
It is in the 212 m elevation (altitude).

Demographics
Maddirala mandal has a population of 30,620. Maddirala is the largest village and Kuntlapally is the smallest village in the mandal.

Villages
 census of India, the mandal has 13 settlements. 
The settlements in the mandal are listed below:

Notes
(†) Mandal headquarter

References

Mandals in Suryapet district